499th may refer to:

499th Air Refueling Wing, aerial refueling unit located at Westover AFB, Massachusetts
499th Bombardment Squadron, inactive United States Air Force unit
499th Fighter-Bomber Squadron, inactive United States Air Force unit

See also
499 (number)
499, the year 499 (CDXCIX) of the Julian calendar
499 BC